Pentagramma mirificum (Latin for miraculous pentagram) is a star polygon on a sphere, composed of five great circle arcs, all of whose internal angles are right angles. This shape was described by John Napier in his 1614 book Mirifici Logarithmorum Canonis Descriptio (Description of the Admirable Table of Logarithms) along with rules that link the values of trigonometric functions of five parts of a right spherical triangle (two angles and three sides). The properties of pentagramma mirificum were studied, among others, by Carl Friedrich Gauss.

Geometric properties 

On a sphere, both the angles and the sides of a triangle (arcs of great circles) are measured as angles.

In the spherical pentagon , every vertex is the pole of the opposite side. For instance, point  is the pole of equator , point  — the pole of equator , etc.

At each vertex of pentagon , the external angle is equal in measure to the opposite side. For instance,  etc.

Gauss's formulas 

Gauss introduced the notation

 

The following identities hold, allowing the determination of any three of the above quantities from the two remaining ones:

 

Gauss proved the following "beautiful equality" (schöne Gleichung):

 

Proof of the first part of the equality:
 

Proof of the second part of the equality:

From Gauss comes also the formula

where  is the area of pentagon .

Gnomonic projection 

The image of spherical pentagon  in the gnomonic projection (a projection from the centre of the sphere) onto any plane tangent to the sphere is a rectilinear pentagon. Its five vertices  unambiguously determine a conic section; in this case — an ellipse. Gauss showed that the altitudes of pentagram  (lines passing through vertices and perpendicular to opposite sides) cross in one point , which is the image of the point of tangency of the plane to sphere.

Arthur Cayley observed that, if we set the origin of a Cartesian coordinate system in point , then the coordinates of vertices :   satisfy the equalities     , where  is the length of the radius of the sphere.

References

External links 
 
 

Spherical trigonometry
Types of polygons